Friedrich-Wilhelm Wichmann (31 August 1901 – 19 November 1974) was a German sprinter. He was part of the German 4 × 100 m relay teams that set four world records in 1928. He competed in the 100 m event at the 1928 Summer Olympics, but his result is unknown.

References

1901 births
1974 deaths
Sportspeople from Dortmund
German male sprinters
Athletes (track and field) at the 1928 Summer Olympics
Olympic athletes of Germany
20th-century German people